Jean-François Bayart, born March 20, 1950, in Boulogne-Billancourt, is a French political scientist and former director of research at the French National Centre for Scientific Research. His specialty is the comparative historical sociology of the state.

He is notably the author of several books on sub-Saharan Africa and the historicity of politics. Since 2015, he has been a professor at the Graduate Institute of International and Development Studies in Geneva.

He was the founder of the journal Politique africaine (in 1980–81), Critique internationale (in 1998) and of the collection “Recherches internationales” (in 1998, published by Éditions Karthala). He was the director of the Centre d'études et de recherche internationales (CERI) of the Paris Institute of Political Studies (Sciences Po) (from 1994 to 2000) and is the founding president of the Fund for the Analysis of Political Societies (FASOPO). (since 2003).

He is a commentator on international politics in various media, notably Mediapart. He was a permanent consultant for the Policy Planning Staff (France) of the French Ministry of Foreign Affairs (1990–2005), and member of the 2013 French White Paper on Defence and National Security (2012–2013). He is the scientific director of the Focus of the Rencontres des cinémas d'Europe at the Maison de l'image d'Aubenas (since 2010). He taught at the Paris Institute of Political Studies, at the University of Paris 1 Pantheon-Sorbonne, at the University of Lausanne and at the University of Turin.

Biography 
Jean-François Bayart graduated from the Paris Institute of Political Studies in 1970. He obtained a doctorate in political science in 1977 under the supervision of Pierre Alexandre and Serge Hurtig.

With his first academic publication, L'État au Cameroun (1979), Jean-François Bayart distanced himself from the schools of thought that then dominated political science – on the one hand, the theories of modernization and political development, of North American origin, on the other, the so-called dependency school, of Latin American origin. The systems of inequality and domination inherent in pre-colonial African societies have their own historical dynamics. Consequently, postcolonial national constructions cannot be understood from the sole point of view of their relations with the Western powers and their position in the world economy, Bayart argued. African states must therefore be analyzed in their historicity, which implies analyzing the power relations within contemporary African societies - in particular the role played by the dominant class in its societies, so as to update all the parameters. that influence the present and the future of these States, he posited.

From this perspective, Jean-François Bayart has developed original concepts, widely used in the field of social sciences, such as the concepts of:

 politics of the belly;
 Rhizome state;
 extraversion strategy;
 reciprocal assimilation of the elites

The same kind of misunderstanding arose during the publication of The Criminalization of the State in Africa (1997, in collaboration with Stephen Ellis and Béatrice Hibou), related to a problematic of historical sociology, and whose analysis was limited to a handful of country.

That is despite the fact that the previous year Jean-François Bayart had criticized culturalism in L'Illusion identitaire (1996), a work in which he took the opposite view of Samuel Huntington's thesis on the “clash of civilizations” and developed a problematic allowing to think of the consubstantial relations between culture and politics “without being a culturalist”, much as ten years before he had sought to think of the dependence of Africa “without being dependent”. Beyond the debates and polemics of the moment, this book was in the same vein of "The State in Africa: the politics of the belly", which refined the issues of the enunciation of politics and extraversion that he had proposed in the 1980s, all the while insisting on the central role of the imaginary in the production of the political and on its relation to the practices of material culture.

The works of Jean-François Bayart in the 1980s insisted on the need to apprehend the political "from the bottom" by drawing attention to the "popular modes of political action", notions that he had put forth in L'État au Cameroun (1979) and which he repeated in articles from Politique africaine and the Revue française de science politique (some of which were collected in "Le Politique par le bas en Afrique noire", published in collaboration with Achille Mbembe and Comi Toulabor in 1992, and reissued in 2008 in a new expanded version). This problematic of "politics from below" was moreover in the spirit of the times since it joined in many ways the concomitant work of the Alltagsgeschichte (the history of everyday life) in Germany, Indian subaltern studies or even by the French historian Michel de Certeau, who participated on several occasions in Jean-François Bayart's seminar at the Center d'études et de recherches international.

After having devoted most of his time to the direction of this think tank from 1994 to 2000, and having refused the scientific direction of the National Foundation of Political Sciences, proposed to him by its administrator, Richard Descoings, Jean-François Bayart set about to write a diptych that crowned his previous work. In "Global Subjects: A Political Critique of Globalization" (2004), he returned to the question of the historicity of the state by showing that the universalization of the latter was a dimension of globalization which had prevailed for two centuries, unlike what international relations the theory claimed. He then introduced to his reflection the concept of "national-liberalism", which he subsequently took up again in a polemical mode in a collection of militant articles, not without specifying that national-liberalism has the same kind of relationship with liberalism as national socialism with socialism (Sortir du national-libéralisme. Political sketches of the years 2004–2012, 2012). In addition, he analyzed, in Global Subjects, the processes of subjectivation that produce globalization, at the interface of material culture and techniques of the body, and which prohibit seeing in globalization only an experience of alienation.

In "Republican Islam. Ankara, Tehran, Dakar" (2010), Bayart again showed, with three supporting case studies, the inanity of the culturalist explanation of politics and replaced it with a sociological interpretation in terms of the formation of the state, insisting once again on its historicity, on the connections between national or imperial trajectories, on the interweaving of the durations constitutive of the political, on the importance of subjectivation practices.

Beyond its monographic scope, this book was implicitly presented as a manifesto of comparative historical sociology of politics, like the small essay "Les Études postcoloniales, un carnaval académique (2010). In particular, Bayart stood against the current of political science known as "transitology" by refining the concept of "Thermidorian situation" that he had advanced in 1991 with regard to the Islamic Republic of Iran, and substituting it to that of the "transition" to democracy and the market economy in the case of regimes resulting from revolutions.

Jean-François Bayart centers his approach on the actual practices of the actors, on ideologies or cultural representations. He questions the paradoxes of history, by insisting on the inseparability of coercion and hegemony, by emphasizing the lived experience of the actors. His method is distinguished by a study that ranges from empirical observation to problematization and theorization. One of the major themes running through his books – besides that of historicity – relates to the incompleteness of political societies and the constitutive ambivalence of social relations.

Jean-François Bayart has long criticized France's foreign policy, believing that it did not sufficiently serve third countries, in particular the former French colonies in Africa. He is also in favor of a total opening of the borders and denounces the efforts of Europe aimed at stemming African immigration, even calling for punishing European leaders, guilty in his eyes of having entered into cooperation agreements with Libya on this topic.

He is also opposed to the application of New Public Management to the fields of higher education and research.

He has founded two journals, the first at the age of thirty, and a collection of books, as well as the Political Societies Analysis Fund. Director (1994–2000) of the Center for International Studies and Research (CERI), his work has promoted its international influence. The functioning of CERI was de-bureaucratized at his initiative. In 2010, he created the Focus of the Rencontres des cinémas d'Europe, at the Maison de l'Image in Aubenas.

According to Morgane Govoreanu, one of the peculiarities of his professional career is to have always distinguished the roles he it imposed on him, and of which he never failed to underline the specific logics: those of the researcher, of the teacher, the administrator, the expert-consultant, the militant commentator.

Career 

 1994 to 2000: Director of CERI
 1980 to 1982: founder and director of the journal Politique africaine
 1998 to 2003: founder and director of the review Critique internationale
 since 1981: member of the scientific council of African Affairs
 since 1998: director of the International Research collection at Éditions Karthala
 1990 to 2005: permanent consultant at the Analysis and Forecasting Center of the Ministry of Foreign Affairs of France
 2002 to 2006: Governor of the European Cultural Foundation (Amsterdam)

Publications 
 L'État au Cameroun, Paris, Presses de la Fondation nationale des sciences politiques, 1979 (2e édition augmentée : 1985) ; notes de lecture par Jean-François Médard, Christian Coulon, Yves-André Fauré, Jean-Claude Barbier, Jean Copans, in Politique africaine, no 1, mars 1981, p. 120-139
 La Politique africaine de François Mitterrand, Paris, Karthala, 1984
 L'État en Afrique. La politique du ventre, Paris, Fayard, 1989 (2e édition augmentée, Fayard, 2006)
 Les Temps modernes, « La France au Rwanda », CERI, Paris, 1995
 L'Illusion identitaire, Paris, Fayard, 1996 (prix Jean-Jacques Rousseau, 1997), 2018
 Le Gouvernement du monde. Une Critique politique de la globalisation, Paris, Fayard, 2004
 Les Études postcoloniales. Un carnaval académique, Paris, Karthala, 2010
 L’Islam républicain. Ankara, Téhéran, Dakar, Paris, Albin Michel, 2010
 Africa en el Espejo. Colonizacion, criminalidad y estado, Mexico, Fondo de Cultura Economica, 2011
 Sortir du national-libéralisme. Croquis politiques des années 2004–2012, Paris, Karthala, 2012
 Le Plan cul. Ethnologie d'une pratique sexuelle, Paris, Fayard, 2014
 Les Fondamentalistes de l'identité. Laïcisme versus djihadisme. Paris, Karthala, 2016
 L'Impasse nationale-libérale, Paris, La découverte, coll. « Cahiers libres », 2017, 229 p.

References

Living people
1950 births
Academic staff of the Graduate Institute of International and Development Studies